Carnero Pass (elevation ) is a mountain pass in Saguache County of south-central Colorado. It is located in the La Garita Mountains, a sub-range of the San Juan Mountains, and divides the waters of Houselog Creek to the north and Carnero Creek to the south. Carnero Pass is traversed by County Road 41G.

The Utes and trappers had established a trail over the pass by the mid 19th Century and by the 1870s, wagons were traversing the pass.

References

External links
 
Carnero Pass, passbagger.org

Mountain passes of Colorado
Landforms of Saguache County, Colorado